Dean Bradley Henderson (born 12 March 1997) is an English professional footballer who plays as a goalkeeper for  club Nottingham Forest, on loan from Manchester United, and the England national team.

Henderson signed his first professional contract with Manchester United in 2015 and extended it in 2018 for a further two years until 2022. He made his debut for Manchester United against Luton Town in the third round of the EFL Cup in 2020. He has also been loaned out to a number of other teams. Having played in various lower divisions, he made his Premier League debut with Sheffield United in 2019. He has represented England at under-16, under-17, under-20, under-21 and senior levels.

Club career

Manchester United
Henderson joined the Manchester United academy aged 14, having spent six years at Carlisle United. He first joined the academy in August 2011.

After progressing through the academy, Henderson was among 10 players to join the Academy squad for the 2013–14 season. He became a regular goalkeeper for the U18 team in the 2013–14 season.

In the 2014–15 season, Henderson continued to impress as a regular goalkeeper for the U18 team, as he made 25 appearances but sustained an injury towards the end of the season. Nevertheless, he was among nominees for the Jimmy Murphy Young Player of the Year award but lost out to Axel Tuanzebe. In August 2015, Henderson signed his first professional contract with the club.

2016: Loan to Stockport County
On 12 January 2016, he was loaned to National League North club Stockport County on an initial one-month loan. He made his Stockport County debut, where he played the whole game, in a 1–1 draw against Nuneaton Town on 16 January 2016.

On 22 February 2016, due to an injury crisis, Henderson was recalled from loan and had his first call-up to a senior Manchester United game, sitting on the bench during a 3–0 FA Cup victory away to Shrewsbury Town.

Henderson then returned to Stockport County to complete his loan spell. His first game after signing for the club for the second time was a 2–0 loss against North Ferriby United on 26 March 2016. He went on to make nine appearances for Stockport County and kept three clean sheets.

2016–2017: Loan to Grimsby Town
On 31 August 2016, Henderson joined League Two club Grimsby Town on loan until the beginning of January 2017. However, he started his Grimsby Town career as second–choice goalkeeper behind James McKeown. Henderson made his debut on 26 December 2016, in a 2–0 victory over Accrington Stanley at Blundell Park. After making his debut, his performance was praised by Manager Marcus Bignot. On 31 December 2016, Henderson had his loan at Grimsby Town extended until the end of January 2017. On the same day, he kept another clean sheet, in a 0–0 draw against Blackpool.

It was then extended again on 25 January 2017, until the end of the 2016–17 season. However, Manchester United recalled Henderson from the loan spell on 3 February 2017, due to an injury to third-choice goalkeeper Joel Castro Pereira. By the time of his departure, Henderson made seven appearances and kept four clean sheets; he had become the first-choice goalkeeper.

2017–2018: Loan to Shrewsbury Town
On 10 July 2017, Henderson joined League One club Shrewsbury Town on loan for the 2017–18 season. Upon joining the club, Henderson was given a number 1 shirt ahead of the new season. Henderson made his Shrewsbury Town debut, in the opening game of the season, where he kept a clean sheet, in a 1–0 win over Northampton Town. He also kept another clean sheet in a follow–up match, in a 1–0 win over AFC Wimbledon. Henderson quickly established himself as the club's first choice goalkeeper and became the club's fan favourite. He also has helped the club win the number of matches to help them go to the top of the table. By September, Henderson reflected his time at the club so far, saying he enjoyed playing football there and playing Saturday/Tuesday is excellent for his development.

By December, there were rumours when his parent club may recall Henderson in January. Later that month, Henderson kept three clean sheets in three matches against Blackpool, Portsmouth and Wigan Athletic. However, Henderson served a three match suspension after being involved in an altercation with an opposition supporter during a 3–1 loss against Blackburn Rovers on 13 January 2018. Initially the club made a decision to appeal, the club changed their mind shortly after. After serving a three match ban, Henderson returned to the starting line-up on 13 February 2018, in a 2–1 win over Fleetwood Town. By the end of March, Henderson kept 13 clean sheets for the team.

On 8 April 2018, he played at Wembley Stadium in the EFL Trophy final against Lincoln City, which Shrewsbury Town lost 1–0, and later that month was one of only three players not from Wigan Athletic or Blackburn Rovers to be selected for the League One PFA Team of the Year. The following month, in the League One play-offs, Henderson kept two clean sheets in a 2–0 win over Charlton Athletic on aggregate to reach the final. Henderson started in goal in the final when Rotherham United beat Shrewsbury Town 2–1 after extra time, and he saved a penalty from David Ball after nine minutes.

Henderson made two separate statements, expressing his gratefulness and admiration for the club, and his hope to one day return in the future.

2018–2020: Loans to Sheffield United

In June 2018, Henderson signed a two-year contract extension with his parent club, which was due to expire in June 2020. On 18 June, he joined Championship club Sheffield United on loan until the end of the 2018–19 season, helping them to secure promotion to the Premier League for the first time since 2007. During his season-long loan, Henderson won the club's Young Player of the Year Award, as well as the Championship Golden Glove keeping 20 clean sheets across the season. Following an impressive debut season in the championship, European giants Bayern Munich and Juventus had reported interest in the goalkeeper.

On 25 July 2019, Henderson signed a new contract with Manchester United until June 2022 and returned on loan to Sheffield United. He made his Premier League debut on 10 August as they began the season with a 1–1 draw at AFC Bournemouth. On 28 September against Liverpool at Bramall Lane, he fumbled a shot from Georginio Wijnaldum for the game's only goal in the 70th minute. His manager Chris Wilder warned him that he would have to do better to succeed for Manchester United or England. On 7 March, Henderson made a triple save, labelled "heroic" by Sky Sports, keeping out a Norwich City goal in a 1–0 victory. Henderson received praise again during Sheffield United's first game following project restart where he kept his 11th clean sheet of the season, making six saves in the process. Following the match, Manchester United manager Ole Gunnar Solskjær confirmed that he sees Henderson as the club's future number one goalkeeper.

2020–2022: Manchester United first team
On 14 August 2020, Henderson was added to Manchester United's senior squad list for the first time. On 26 August, he signed a new long-term contract that would keep him at Manchester United until June 2025. He made his senior debut in the third round of the League Cup against Luton Town, keeping a clean sheet in the process during United's 3–0 win. He made his second appearance for United a week later in the fourth round of the League Cup, keeping another clean sheet in a 3–0 victory over Brighton & Hove Albion. On 4 November, Henderson made his Champions League debut for United in a 2–1 group stage away defeat to İstanbul Başakşehir. Twenty-five days later, he made his league debut for the club as a substitute for the injured David de Gea in a 3–2 away win over Southampton.

2022–2023: Loan to Nottingham Forest
It was announced on 2 July 2022 that Henderson would be joining newly promoted Premier League club Nottingham Forest on loan for the 2022–23 season. On 14 August 2022, Henderson saved a penalty from Declan Rice and kept a clean sheet in a 1–0 win against West Ham as Forest won the first Premier League game played at the City Ground in 23 years.

International career

Early career
Henderson has represented England at under-16, under-17, under-20 and under-21 levels.

England U20
In late-August 2016, Henderson was called up by under-20 team for the first time. He made his England U20 debut, where he started as a goalkeeper, in a 1–1 draw against Brazil on 1 September 2016. In May 2017, he was selected in the England under-20 squad for the 2017 FIFA U-20 World Cup. He made one appearance at the tournament, in a group stage match against Guinea, and was an unused substitute during England's victory against Venezuela in the final. After the match, Henderson described this an "unbelievable feeling".

England U21
In August 2017, Henderson was called up by the under-21 for the first time and appeared as an unused substitute against Latvia. He then appeared two more times as an unused substitute that saw him miss out two matches for the team in the league.

He made his under-21 debut on 24 March 2018, in a friendly at home against Romania, which England won 2–1. Henderson was named as England's number one for the 2019 UEFA European Under-21 Championship.

Senior team
On 8 October 2019, Henderson was called up to the senior England squad for the first time by manager Gareth Southgate as a replacement for the injured Tom Heaton. He made his debut on 12 November 2020 when he came on at half time to replace Nick Pope in a 3–0 win over the Republic of Ireland in a friendly.

Henderson was named as a member of England's 26-man squad for the delayed Euro 2020 and allocated the number 13 shirt. However, he withdrew due to a hip injury after the first game and was replaced by Aaron Ramsdale. England lost the final to Italy and finished in second place.

Style of play
Henderson is known for his distribution with both his hands and feet as a goalkeeper, as well as his ability to claim crosses or to catch and punch high balls, with Rob Dawson of ESPN describing him as "more complete" than his teammate David de Gea in 2021. Mark Critchley of The Independent has also described him as a "vocal presence" in goal.

Personal life
Henderson was born in Whitehaven, Cumbria. He played county cricket as a schoolboy and was an accomplished batsman and wicket-keeper but chose football. Henderson initially started out as an outfield player before switching to his role as a goalkeeper.

During his time at Shrewsbury Town, Henderson shaved off all of his hair in support of Hope House.

On 27 May 2019, Henderson achieved two Guinness World Records titles for 'Fastest time to dress as a goalkeeper (football)' (49.51 seconds) and 'Most football headed passes in one minute (team of two)' (91 – with Jake Clarke-Salter).

Career statistics

Club

International

Honours
Shrewsbury Town
EFL Trophy runner-up: 2017–18

Manchester United
UEFA Europa League runner-up: 2020–21

England U20
FIFA U-20 World Cup: 2017

England
UEFA European Championship runner-up: 2020

Individual
PFA Team of the Year: 2017–18 League One
Sheffield United Young Player of the Year: 2018–19, 2019–20
Sheffield United Community Player of the Year: 2018–19
EFL Championship Golden Glove: 2018–19

References

External links

Profile at the Manchester United F.C. website
Profile at the Football Association website

1997 births
Living people
Sportspeople from Whitehaven
Footballers from Cumbria
English footballers
Association football goalkeepers
Carlisle United F.C. players
Manchester United F.C. players
Stockport County F.C. players
Grimsby Town F.C. players
Shrewsbury Town F.C. players
Sheffield United F.C. players
Nottingham Forest F.C. players
National League (English football) players
English Football League players
Premier League players
England youth international footballers
England under-21 international footballers
England international footballers
UEFA Euro 2020 players